The Shute Octagon House is a historic octagon house located on McGuire School Road in Duanesburg, Schenectady County, New York. It was built about 1855 by noted master carpenter Alexander Delos "Boss" Jones. It is a 2-story, clapboard-sided farmhouse with a -story wing in the Greek Revival style. It features innovative stacked plank construction, a low-pitched polygonal roof surmounted by a widow's walk, a full entablature circling the structure. A 1-story porch with porte cochere was added about 1906. Also on the property are four contributing barns, a shed, and a smokehouse.

The property was covered in a 1984 study of Duanesburg historical resources.
The property was also-covered in a study of Boss Jones TR

It was listed on the National Register of Historic Places in 1984.

References

Houses on the National Register of Historic Places in New York (state)
Greek Revival houses in New York (state)
Houses completed in 1855
Octagon houses in New York (state)
Schenectady
National Register of Historic Places in Schenectady County, New York